A polycatenane is a polymer consisting of mechanically linked catenane structures. Depending on the location of the catenane structures in the polymer chain, the polycatenanes can be divided into main-chain polycatenanes and side-chain polycatenanes. [n]-Catenanes (for large n), which consist solely of the mechanically interlocked cyclic components, can be viewed as “optimized” polycatenanes.

The characteristic feature of a polycatenane compound, that distinguishes it from other polymers, is the presence of mechanical bonds in addition to covalent bonds.

References 

 

Polymers
Supramolecular chemistry